Xiangqi at the 2010 Asian Games was held in Guangzhou Chess Institute, Guangzhou, China from November 13 to November 19, 2010.

China won both gold medals in individual standard Xiangqi.

Schedule

Medalists

Medal table

Participating nations
A total of 26 athletes from 10 nations competed in xiangqi at the 2010 Asian Games:

References
Asian Xiangqi Federation

External links
Xiangqi Site of 2010 Asian Games

 
2010 Asian Games events
2010
Asian games